The Royal Academy of Archaeology of Belgium, founded in 1842, is a learned society in Belgium that works to promote research and education in the fields of archaeology and art history. In a federal country with most powers devolved to the regions and communities, it is one of the few cultural institutions operating at a federal level. Long established in the Royal Museums of Art and History, since 2009 it has met in the Academy Palace.

Publications
The academy publishes or has published:
 Annales de l'Académie royale d'Archéologie de Belgique (1843–1930)
 Bulletin de l'Académie royale d'Archéologie de Belgique (1868–1930)
 Revue belge d'Archéologie et d'Histoire de l'Art / Belgisch Tijdschrift voor Oudheidkunde en Kunstgeschiedenis (1931–)

Presidents
The first president of the academy was Joseph de Kerckhove.

References

External links
 

Archaeological organizations
1842 establishments in Belgium
History organisations based in Belgium